Advanced Aircraft Corporation is an aircraft manufacturer based in Carlsbad, California.

History
AAC bought out Riley Aircraft in 1983.

Products
The firm has specialised in converting piston-engined Cessna aircraft to turbine-engined configuration with Pratt & Whitney Canada PT6A turboprops.

References 
 

Aircraft manufacturers of the United States
Companies based in Carlsbad, California
Privately held companies based in California
1983 establishments in California